Avondale is a suburb of Christchurch in the South Island of New Zealand. The suburb is centered on Avondale Road and so named due to its proximity to the Avon River. It has a good sized park on Mervyn Drive called Avondale Park. This park has a kids playground, a tennis court, basketball court, and a football field in winter. There is ample vacant red zone land in Avondale for activities such as leisure and dog walking.

Canterbury earthquakes 
During the 2010–2011 Christchurch earthquakes, Avondale was hit hard by damage to land and buildings due to soil liquefaction, part of Avondale was declared by the government as a residential red zone. This meant that the government considers rebuilding the infrastructure in such zone uneconomic, and the residents' properties were purchased by the government under what has been called a voluntary yet coercive scheme – while residents were free to refuse the government's buyout of their homes, the government cautioned that remaining in place would entail a lack of insurance, infrastructure, and city services. The government's red zone declaration was ruled as unlawful by the High Court in August 2013 on the grounds that it was not pursuant to the Canterbury Earthquake Recovery Act. Many roads remain damaged in Avondale as of 2014, posing a problem for residents, and the Avon river's banks had to be built up in the suburb to avoid flooding. Portaloos were present on some streets due to destroyed sewers. Building, sewer and road reparations are currently underway in the suburb.

Demographics

Avondale (Christchurch City) had a population of 2,373 at the 2018 New Zealand census, an increase of 21 people (0.9%) since the 2013 census, and a decrease of 360 people (-13.2%) since the 2006 census. There were 894 households. There were 1,161 males and 1,212 females, giving a sex ratio of 0.96 males per female. The median age was 36.7 years (compared with 37.4 years nationally), with 462 people (19.5%) aged under 15 years, 495 (20.9%) aged 15 to 29, 1,071 (45.1%) aged 30 to 64, and 339 (14.3%) aged 65 or older.

Ethnicities were 84.5% European/Pākehā, 15.5% Māori, 5.3% Pacific peoples, 5.3% Asian, and 2.1% other ethnicities (totals add to more than 100% since people could identify with multiple ethnicities).

The proportion of people born overseas was 14.4%, compared with 27.1% nationally.

Although some people objected to giving their religion, 53.9% had no religion, 33.0% were Christian, 1.3% were Hindu, 0.3% were Muslim, 0.5% were Buddhist and 2.3% had other religions.

Of those at least 15 years old, 213 (11.1%) people had a bachelor or higher degree, and 471 (24.6%) people had no formal qualifications. The median income was $32,500, compared with $31,800 nationally. The employment status of those at least 15 was that 984 (51.5%) people were employed full-time, 285 (14.9%) were part-time, and 84 (4.4%) were unemployed.

Education
Chisnallwood Intermediate is the main Intermediate school in the eastern suburbs, and is located in Avondale.

References

Suburbs of Christchurch